Fisher & Paykel Healthcare Corporation Limited (FPH) is a manufacturer, designer and marketer of products and systems for use in respiratory care, acute care, and the treatment of obstructive sleep apnea. Based in New Zealand, their products and systems are sold in around 120 countries worldwide. FPH is primarily an exporting company, with just 1 percent of revenue coming from New Zealand sales.

History
Fisher & Paykel began in 1934 as an importer of refrigerators, washing machines and radios. In 1938, F&P signed an agreement with Kelvinator and in the mid-1950s moved to manufacturing products using the company's own technology.

The involvement in healthcare started in the late 1960s when F&P sought involvement in a business that could benefit from their growing manufacturing and electronic expertise. A prototype respiratory humidifier, developed in New Zealand for use with patients being ventilated in hospital intensive care situations, was taken to the production stage by F&P. Continuing product innovation to improve patient care and development of a world-wide distribution network are two core strengths.

The company was separated and was also listed on the stock exchange on 14 November 2001. As part of a reorganization, Fisher & Paykel Industries Limited was renamed Fisher & Paykel Healthcare Corporation Limited and a new company, Fisher & Paykel Appliances Holdings Limited, was established to own F&P's appliances and finance business.

In connection with the reorganisation, Fisher & Paykel Healthcare Corporation Limited listed on the Australian and New Zealand Stock Exchanges and Nasdaq. In February 2003 the Nasdaq listing was terminated.

Business areas
The company maintains focus on two major product groups.

Respiratory and Acute Care
Respiratory humidifiers, single-use and reusable chambers and breathing circuits and accessories. These are designed to humidify and deliver the gases that a patient receives during mechanical ventilation, non-invasive ventilation, oxygen therapy, and laparoscopic surgery.

Their neonatal care products include infant warmers to help maintain normal body temperature, infant resuscitators and CPAP systems designed to improve infant respiratory function.

Obstructive sleep apnea
Continuous positive airway pressure (CPAP) therapy products, which are used in the treatment of obstructive sleep apnoea to prevent temporary airway closure during sleep. Their products, including integrated flow generator-humidifiers, are designed to deliver humidified airflow to patients during CPAP therapy.

Manufacturing
They manufacture, assemble and test their complete range of products, including many components, at their facilities in New Zealand with a total area of approximately 560,000 ft2 (51,000 m2). An additional manufacturing facility was established in Tijuana, Mexico, in 2010. The Tijuana facility was responsible for approximately 30% of the company's total production volume, and approximately 50% of all products sold in the US, in 2015. A second Tijuana manufacturing facility was completed in January 2019. A third facility in Mexico was being planned in 2020.

Management
 Lewis Gradon: Managing Director & Chief Executive Officer
 Lyndal York: Chief Financial Officer
 Paul Shearer: Senior Vice President, Sales & Marketing

Share registrar
 In New Zealand: Link Market Services
 In Australia: Link Market Services

References

External links
 
 Other company sites www.myOptiflow.com

Health care companies of New Zealand
Companies based in Auckland
Manufacturing companies established in 1934
New Zealand brands
Companies listed on the Australian Securities Exchange
Companies listed on the New Zealand Exchange
New Zealand companies established in 1934
New Zealand design